Tirunaarayur Soundaryeswarar Temple is a Hindu temple located at Thirunaraiyur in Cuddalore district of Tamil Nadu, India.  The presiding deity is Shiva. He is called as Soundaryeswarar. His consort is known as Tiripurasundari.

Significance 
It is one of the shrines of the 275 Paadal Petra Sthalams - Shiva Sthalams glorified in the early medieval Tevaram poems by Tamil Saivite Nayanar Tirugnanasambandar.

Literary mention 
Tirgnanasambandar describes the feature of the deity as:

References

External links 
 
 
 

Shiva temples in Cuddalore district
Padal Petra Stalam